Jerod Morris is a 2004 graduate of Indiana University and the Founder and Managing Editor of the Midwest Sports Fans blog.

Controversy 
In June 2009 Morris made national news when he posted a blog about Raúl Ibañez entitled "The Curious Case of Raúl Ibañez: Steroid Speculation Perhaps Unfair, But Great Start in 2009 Raising Eyebrows." The article was quickly picked up by John Gonzalez of the Philadelphia Inquirer and Ibañez responded, "You can have my urine, my hair, my blood, my stool - anything you can test."
Following the editorial rebuttals, ESPN's "Outside the Lines" picked up the story and showcased Morris, John Gonzalez and Ken Rosenthal. Although Morris's article was not intended to be accusatory of Ibanez, the debate on the invisible lines for bloggers and mainstream media remains.

Contributions To The Blogosphere 

Moris is the Managing Editor of MidwestSportsFans.com and a consultant for Carpet Complaints Insides.  Morris is also one of four contributors to How-To-Blog.TV.

References 

American sportswriters
American bloggers
Living people
21st-century American non-fiction writers
Year of birth missing (living people)